Chris Etheridge is a retired British sidecarcross rider. In the Sidecarcross World Championship his greatest success has been three top-ten finishes in a career stretching over sixteen seasons from 1986 to 2001, while domestically he has won ten national British Sidecarcross Championships, a record at the time but since broken.

Racing career

British Championship
Chris Etheridge entered the national British Sidecarcross Championship for the first time in 1985 and would compete at this level for the next eighteen years, racing mostly with Shane Skeats as his passenger in the early seasons. The pair finished eighth overall in 1985 but soon became much more competitive, finishing runners-up in the following five seasons from 1986 to 1990. In this era however Paul and Mark Millard proved to strong for Etheridge on each occasion, the Millards taking out five consecutive national titles. The closest Etheridge came to finishing above the pair was in 1987 when he finished only thirteen points behind.

With a new passenger, Nick Brace, a new engine make, a Zabel, and the retirement of Paul Millard Etheridge started to dominate the national championship from 1991 onwards, winning six consecutive titles until 1997. The first three seasons were won with a comfortable margin, in 1994 however Etheridge took the title out by only four points. Etheridge had almost missed out because of a broken shoulder the week before the final round but rode despite the injury and against the doctors advice. From 1994 he switched to Garry Withers as his permanent passenger, having utilised him before sporadically.

His run of national titles was stopped in 1998 when Peter Clark and John Chambers took out the title and Etheridge came only third. Etheridge, now with Chambers as his passenger, won three more national titles from 1998 onwards. The 1998 one meant he surpassed the previous record of seven national titles held by Terry Good. After his tenth and last championship in 2001 Etheridge retired from the sport domestically and internationally.

Etheridge made a brief return to the competition when he raced in place of his son injured Jack for one event in Wooley Grange in July 2012.

His record of ten national titles was surpassed by Stuart Brown in 2013 when the latter won his eleventh title.

World Championship
Chris Etheridge made his debut in the Sidecarcross World Championship at the opening race of the 1986 season, the British Grand Prix, finishing third in his first-ever race and eighteenth overall in the competition. The first seven seasons Etheridge experienced moderate success in the competition, racing sporadically, with a twelfth place overall and two podium finishes in races in 1991 as his best result. A more successful era followed from 1993 to 1995 when, racing with Garry Withers as his passenger he finished in the top-ten each season. The 1993 season became his best-ever in the World Championship, finishing seventh overall and taking out three race wins, one in Germany and two at the British Grand Prix in Langrish, thereby winning the later event, the only GP victory in his career.

The 1994 and 1995 seasons were not quite as successful, finishing tenth and ninth overall and winning only one more race, the first race in the first of two French Grand Prix in 1994. From 1996 onwards his results and number of race participations declined again, Etheridge not finishing in the top-ten again in his final six seasons in the competition. He managed to win two more races, in the Czech Republic in 1996 and in Switzerland in 2000 without achieving any other podium finishes in this time. In his final season, 2001, he finished twenty first, one place and point behind fellow British rider Stuart Brown who would succeed Etheridge as the most outstanding British rider of his period domestically and internationally from then on.

Private life
Etheridge hails from Staplehurst, near Maidstone in Kent. His son Jack is also a sidecarcross rider and active in both the British and World Championship.

Season by season
The season by season results in the World Championship for Chris Etheridge:

Key

Honours
 British National Sidecarcross Championship 
 Winners: (10) 1991–1997, 1999–2001
 Runners-up: (5) 1986–1991

References

External links
 The John Davey Pages Sidecarcross results and statistics

Living people
British sidecarcross riders
People from Staplehurst
Sportspeople from Kent
Year of birth missing (living people)